The Social Buccaneer is a 1916 American silent drama film directed by Jack Conway and starring J. Warren Kerrigan, Louise Lovely and Maude George. Prints and/or fragments were found in the Dawson Film Find in 1978.

Cast
 J. Warren Kerrigan as Chattfield Bruce 
 Louise Lovely as Marjorie Woods 
 Maude George as Miss Goldberg 
 Harry Carter as Caglioni 
 Marc B. Robbins as Nathan Goldberg 
 Hayward Mack as Sir Archibald Bamford

References

Bibliography
 Goble, Alan. The Complete Index to Literary Sources in Film. Walter de Gruyter, 1999.

External links
 

1916 films
1916 drama films
1910s English-language films
American silent feature films
Silent American drama films
Films directed by Jack Conway
American black-and-white films
Universal Pictures films
1910s American films